A Matter to Settle (Polish: Sprawa do zalatwienia) is a 1953 Polish comedy film directed by Jan Fethke and Jan Rybkowski and starring Gizela Piotrowska, Bogdan Niewinowski and Adolf Dymsza.

Partial cast
 Gizela Piotrowska as Zofia Lipinska 
 Bogdan Niewinowski as Stefan Wisniewski  
 Adolf Dymsza as Train Passenger / Taxi Driver / Clerk / Waiter Wladyslaw / Reporter Banasinski / Salesman / Playboy / Boxer Fronczak  
 Hanka Bielicka as Tradeswoman, Train Passenger  
 Irena Brodzinska as Singer  
 Edward Dziewonski as Factory Manager  
 Waclaw Jankowski as Waiter  
 Zofia Jamry as Playboy's Girl  
 Irena Kwiatkowska as Train Passenger  
 Józef Kondrat as Train Passenger 
 Jan Kurnakowicz as Sound Technician  
 Antoni Kolczyński as Boxer Józwiak  
 Stanislaw Lapinski as Manager at Restaurant  
 Kazimierz Opalinski as Director, Train Passenger  
 Lech Ordon as Jerzy  
 Jerzy Pietraszkiewicz as Singer 
 Stefan Witas as Guest at Restaurant

References

Bibliography 
 Charles Ford & Robert Hammond. Polish Film: A Twentieth Century History. McFarland, 2005.

External links 
 

1953 films
1953 comedy films
Polish comedy films
1950s Polish-language films
Films directed by Jan Rybkowski
Polish black-and-white films